Araban (also Romanized as ‘Arabān; also known as Arāvūn and Arāwun) is a village in Chalanchulan Rural District, Silakhor District, Dorud County, Lorestan Province, Iran. At the 2006 census, its population was 448, in 109 families.

References 

Towns and villages in Dorud County